Point of No Return was a vegan, straight edge metalcore band from São Paulo, Brazil.

History

Point Of No Return assembled in 1996, initially as a side project of the band Self-Conviction. Point Of No Return's lyrics primarily focused on "Third World struggles" and animal liberation issues. Their sound was described as a mix of Earth Crisis metal mosh with death metal elements. The band had three singers, like their North American counterpart, Path of Resistance. 

Point Of No Return's first full-length album, Centelha (“Sparks”), was released on CD by Liberation Records in Brazil and Catalyst Records in the United States. The band toured internationally, first to Europe in 2000 and then to Argentina in 2001. After a seven month hiatus and an alleged "last show" in Argentina, the band came back with a second album in 2002, Liberdade Imposta, Liberdade Conquistada (“Imposed Freedom, Conquered Freedom”) and returned to tour Europe a second time. The songs on this second album—this time with lyrics completely in Portuguese—dealt with sociopolitical issues and were more deeply melancholic, but also carried a strong influence from bands like Cro-Mags, Judge, and Napalm Death.

Point of No Return played their final show in 2006.

Members
 Alexandre Fanuchi, aka Kalota – vocals
 Frederico Freitas – vocals
 Marcos Suarez – vocals
 Tarcísio Leite – guitar
 Paulo Júnior, aka Juninho – guitar
 Jefferson Queiroz, aka Tigrilo – bass
 Luciano Juliato, aka Lobinho – drums
 Gilberto Gomes, aka China – bass

Albums
Voices (1997,  Liberation Records (Brazil))
What Was Done (1999, Catalyst Records)
Centelha (2000, Liberation Records (Brazil))
Sparks (2001, Catalyst Records – Centelha US release)
Liberdade Imposta, Liberdade Conquistada (2002, Liberation Records (Brazil))
Imposed Freedom, Conquered Freedom (2002, Scorched Earth Police – Liberdade... European release)

References

External links
 
 Point of no Return at Spotify

Metalcore musical groups
Straight edge groups
Brazilian hardcore punk groups
Musical groups established in 1996
Musical groups disestablished in 2006
1996 establishments in Brazil
2006 disestablishments in Brazil